Cerro Guanaco is a 1959 Argentine film directed by José Ramón Luna.

Cast
 Mario Amaya		
 Leyla Dartel		
 Francisco de Paula		
 Raúl del Valle		
 Floren Delbene		
 Jorge Lanza		
 Margarita Palacios		
 Félix Rivero		
 León Zárate

External links

References

1959 films
Argentine drama films
1950s Spanish-language films
1950s Argentine films